Abdul Hai Habibi – ʿAbd' ul-Ḥay Ḥabībi) (1910 – 9 May 1984) was a prominent Afghan historian for much of his lifetime as well as a member of the National Assembly of Afghanistan (Afghan Parliament) during the reign of King Zahir Shah. A Pashtun nationalist from  Kakar tribe of  Kandahar, Afghanistan, he began as a young teacher who made his way up to become a writer, scholar, politician and Dean of Faculty of Literature at Kabul University. He is the author of over 100 books but is best known for editing Pata Khazana, an old Pashto language manuscript that he claimed to have discovered in 1944; but the academic community does not unanimously agree upon its genuineness.

Biography 
Habibi was born in Kandahar city of Afghanistan in 1910, in a  Pashtun family of scholars of Kakar tribe. He was the great grandson of Allamah Habibullah, the eminent scholar known as "Kandahari intellectual" who authored many books. Habibi's father died at an early age and he grew up studying in the mosques of Kandahar, and in 1920 he was admitted to the primary school of Shalimar. Being good at his studies, he received his diploma at the age of 15 and began working as a teacher in the primary schools of Kandahar. In 1927 he was appointed as the deputy editor of Tulo Afghan weekly newspaper in Kandahar and 3 years later became the editor of the newspaper.

In 1950s, he was forced to exile by living in Peshawar, Pakistan, because of his opposition to Afghan Prime Minister Shah Mahmud Khan. While in exile, he published a journal called Azad Afghanistan (Free Afghanistan). He was permitted to return to Afghanistan in 1961 to become professor in the faculty of literature of Kabul University. In 1966, he was appointed president of Afghan Historical Society and he published a number of books on Afghan history. Senzil Nawid writes:

As an academic, Habibi worked diligently throughout his life. He is the author of 115 books and over 500 papers and articles on the literature, history, philosophy, linguistics, poetics and the culture of the people of Afghanistan. Several of his books have been translated to English, Arabic, German and other foreign languages.

Abdul Hai Habibi died on 9 May 1984, in Kabul, during the Soviet–Afghan War. He was 74 years old at the time of his death. He was fluent in Pashto and Dari.

Summary of official positions
Teacher in the primary schools of Kandahar, 1925 to 1927.
Deputy editor of Tuloo-e Afghan newspaper, 1927 to 1931.
Editor of Tuloo-e Afghan, 1931 to 1940.
President of Pashto Academy (Pashto Tolana) in Kabul, 1940 to 1941 (at the same time he served as the Deputy President of the Department of Publications).
Advisor to the Education Ministry in Kabul, 1941 to 1944.
Chairman of the first College of Letters of Kabul University, and president of the Pashto Academy and professor of history of Pashto literature, 1944 *to 1946.
President of the Education Department of Kandahar, 1946 to 1947.
Commercial attaché in Quetta, Balochistan, 1947.
Elected representative of Kandahar province during the 7th session of the National Assembly of Afghanistan (Afghan Parliament), 1948 to 1951.
Received the rank of professor from Kabul University in 1965.
President of Afghan Historical Society, 1966 to 1971.
Advisor on cultural affairs to Prime Minister Mohammad Musa Shafiq, 1972 to 1973.
Professor of literature and history, Kabul University, 1970 to 1977.
Advisor to the Ministry of Information and culture, 1978 to 1982.

Criticism
Pata Khazana, one of Habibi's major works, has been questioned by several prominent scholars for lacking strong evidence. British Iranologist, David Neil MacKenzie, concludes from the anachronisms that the document was fabricated only shortly before its claimed discovery in 1944. MacKenzie's central argument refers to the use of the modern Pashto letters Dze (ځ ) and Nur (ڼ ) throughout the script. These letters were only introduced into the Pashto alphabet in 1936 when the Afghan government reformed the Pashto orthography. The two letters have never been found simultaneously in any genuine manuscript before 1935.

Habibi responded to his critics in 1977 by stating:

See also 

 Pata Khazana
 Ghulam Mohammad Ghobar
 Allama Habibi Research Center, a website dedicated to sharing his books, articles, and poetry.

References

1910 births
1984 deaths
Afghan writers
Pashtun writers
Pashtun people
Academic staff of Kabul University